Zaytsevo is a village in Vyborgsky District of Leningrad Oblast, Russia.  Before the Continuation War, the village was called Inkilä. The station of the Vyborg–Joensuu railroad situated in Zaytsevo is called Inkilya.

Rural localities in Leningrad Oblast
Karelian Isthmus